Valentina Dmitrievna Sharykina (born February 25, 1940, Kyiv, Ukrainian SSR, Soviet Union) is a Soviet and Russian stage and film actress. People's Artist of Russia (2000).

Selected filmography
 The Third Half (1962) as Vera
 Flying Days (1966) as Fyodor Ivanovich's wife
 Older Sister (1966) as Shura
 July Rain (1966) as Lyusya
 Major Whirlwind (1967) as girl dancing at the restaurant
 Yegor Bulychyov and Others (1971) as Elizaveta
 Ruslan and Lyudmila (1972) as episode
 Privalov's Millions (1972) as actress Kolpakova
 Vanyushin's Children (1973) as Lyudmila Krasavina
 Down House (2001) as general's wife Ivolgina
 Long Farewell (2004) as  Lyalya in old
 Voronin's Family (TV series, 2010) as  Tatyana Alekseevna
 Yeltsin: Three Days in August (2011) as Emma Yazova
 Happy Together (TV series, 2012) as  Iraida

Personal life
in the 1970s she was in a de facto marriage with film director Yevgeny Tashkov.

References

External links
 

1940 births
Living people
Actors from Kyiv
Soviet film actresses
Soviet stage actresses
Soviet television actresses
Russian film actresses
Russian stage actresses
Russian television actresses
Honored Artists of the RSFSR
People's Artists of Russia